Netherlands women's national floorball team is the national team of the Netherlands. At the 2005 Floorball Women's World Championship in Singapore, the team finished seventh in the B-Division. At the 2007 Floorball Women's World Championship in Frederikshavn, Denmark, the team finished fourth in the B-Division.

References

External links
 

Women's national floorball teams
Floorball